The Hulbert House and McAlpin Bridal Cottage are two historic houses in Cincinnati, Ohio, United States.  They have together been listed in the National Register of Historic Places since April 29, 1982.

Historic uses 
Single Dwelling

Notes 

National Register of Historic Places in Cincinnati
Houses in Cincinnati
Houses on the National Register of Historic Places in Ohio